Caroline Brittan (born 9 March 1959) is a British cross-country skier. She competed in the women's 5 kilometres at the 1984 Winter Olympics.

References

External links
 

1959 births
Living people
British female cross-country skiers
Olympic cross-country skiers of Great Britain
Cross-country skiers at the 1984 Winter Olympics
Place of birth missing (living people)